Shahid Qasem Soleimani Stadium (Persian: ورزشگاه شهید قاسم سلیمانی, Vârzeshgah-e Shihid-e Qasim Silimani) is a soccer-specific stadium belongs to Tractor S.C. (Training Stadium), located in west Tabriz, Iran. The capacity of the stadium is 12,000. The stadium was founded in 2011 as Bonyan Diesel Stadium, and it was renamed Shahid Qasem Soleimani in 2020.

History
The building process of the stadium began on 1 June 2010 and the first phase operated with 2,000 seats, especially the audience, competitions, and other facilities needed for the lawn.  

The second phase of standardization of stadium optimized lawn irrigation and drainage system started on 22 July 2011. Also, the seating capacity was upgraded from 2,000 to 7,000 seats and then to 12,000 seats in the third phase. 

The stadium was officially opened on 27 November 2011 by Mayor of Tabriz, Alireza Navin and Gostaresh began playing at this stadium from 2012–13 season that helped them to promotion to the Iran Pro League for the first time in their history.

International Matches

References

Football venues in Iran
Multi-purpose stadiums in Iran
Sports venues in Tabriz
Sports venues completed in 2011